This article is about the demographic features of the population of Belgium, including ethnicity, education level, health of the populace, economic status, religious affiliations and other aspects of the population. All figures are from the National Institute for Statistics unless otherwise indicated.

Population

Belgium had a population of 11,190,846 people on 1 January 2015 as compared to the 10,839,905 people on 1 January 2010, an increase of 601,000 in comparison to 2000 (10,239,085 inhabitants). Between 1990 (9,947,782 inhabitants) and 2000 the increase was only 291,000. As of January 1, 2020, Belgium has a population of 11,492,641 and is the 80th most populous country in the world. The population of Flanders, Wallonia and Brussels on January 1, 2019 was 6,589,069 (57.6% of Belgium), 3,633,795 (31.8% of Belgium) and 1,208,542 (10.6% of Belgium), respectively. The most densely populated province is Antwerp, the least densely populated province is Luxembourg.

The following demographic statistics are from the World Population Review in 2019.
One birth every 4 minutes
One death every 5 minutes
One net migrant every 12 minutes
Net gain of one person every 9 minutes

Life expectancy 
Sources: Our World In Data and the United Nations.

1841–1950

1950–2015

Source: UN World Population Prospects

Life expectancy at birth; total population: 81.65 years. Country comparison to the world: 32nd

 male: 79.02 years
 female: 84.4 years (2021 est.)

Fertility 
The total fertility rate (TFR) gradually increased during the last decade from 1.60 in 1997, 1.65 in 2002 and 1.82 in 2007. The rates in Brussels are higher than the national average (1.79 in 1997, 1.93 in 2002 and 2.09 in 2007), while they are below the average in Flanders (1.54 in 1997, 1.56 in 2002 and 1.77 in 2007), due to the higher percentage of non-European immigrants with higher birth rates in Brussels.

The total fertility rate is the number of children born per woman. It is based on fairly good data for the entire period. Sources: Our World In Data and Gapminder Foundation.

Total fertility rate; 1.71 children born/woman (2021 est.) Country comparison to the world: 160st

Birth rate; 11.03 births/1,000 population (2021 est.) Country comparison to the world: 175st

Mother's mean age at first birth; 29 years (2018 est.)

Age structure 

0-14 years: 17.22% (male 1,033,383/female 984,624)
15-24 years: 11.2% (male 670,724/female 642,145)
25-54 years: 39.23% (male 2,319,777/female 2,278,450)
55-64 years: 13.14% (male 764,902/female 775,454)
65 years and over: 19.21% (male 988,148/female 1,263,109)

Median age in 2020 (estimation); total: 41.6 years.

 male: 40.4 years
 female: 42.8 years

Density 
Urbanization; urban population: 98.1% of total population (2020)

rate of urbanization: 0.62% annual rate of change (2015-20 est.)

Vital statistics 

Note: Territorial changes in East-Belgium occurred in 1925, 1940 and 1944.

Current vital statistics

Immigration
Since the relaxation of the Belgian nationality law more than 1.3 million migrants have acquired Belgian citizenship and are now considered new Belgians. 89.2% of inhabitants of Turkish origin have been naturalized, as have 88.4% of people of Moroccan background, 75.4% of Italians, 56.2% of the French and 47.8% of Dutch people.

In 2007, there were 1.38 million foreign-born residents in Belgium, corresponding to 12.9% of the total population. Of these, 685 000 (6.4%) were born outside the EU and 695 000 (6.5%) were born in another EU Member State.

Net migration rate; 4.58 migrant(s)/1,000 population (2021 est.)

Employment and income 
Unemployment, youth ages 15–24; total: 15.8%. 
male: 16.2%
female: 15.3% (2018 est.)

Education 
Literacy; Definition: age 15 and over can read and write (2003 est.)
Total population: 99%
Male: 99%
Female: 99%
School life expectancy (primary to tertiary education); total: 20 years

male: 19 years
female: 21 years (2018)

Origin groups

Belgium does not collect data on ethnicity or race, but does collect data on the country of origin of citizens.

The country is populated by a Flemish majority of about 6,010,000 people speaking Dutch, a French-speaking minority of 5,480,000 people (Walloons and French-speakers in Brussels and in Flanders (400.000)  ), as well as 73,000 German speaking people in Wallonia, near the German border.

The largest group of immigrants and their descendants in Belgium are Italian Belgians, with more than 450,000 people, which is well over 4% of Belgium's total population. The Moroccan Belgians are the third-largest group, and the largest Muslim ethnic group, numbering 340,359. According to Michèle Tribalat in the beginning of 2020, people of foreign background and their descendants were estimated to have formed 32.1% of the total population. According to Statbel, 66.6% of the Belgian population was Belgian with a Belgian background in 2022. The Belgian background by age group was 53.3% among those under 18, 64.6% among 18-64-year-olds and 86.5% among those aged 65 and over.

Of these 'New Belgians', 55.1% are of non-Belgian European ancestry and 44.9% are from non-Western countries.

The rest consists mostly of French-speaking people from Brussels, Turks, Kurds, Dutch, French, Portuguese, Spaniards, Greeks, Bosniaks, Algerians, Congolese, Vietnamese, Poles, Indians, and Guineans (around 23% of Belgium's population is of non-Belgian origin). Approximately 30,000 Roma live in Belgium.

The exact number of French-speakers in Brussels is hard to determine, but it is estimated that 85% of the people living in Brussels use French and 10% use Dutch in their households, as the sole language or secondary language, while Arabic is also largely spoken. See the Brussels article for more details.

In the table are the top 30 countries by origin of the population of Belgium in 2020

Languages

Belgium's three official languages are Dutch, spoken by about 60% of the population, French, spoken by about 40%, and German, spoken by less than 1%. The vast majority of Belgium's population, 99%, is literate as defined by the Belgian government, i.e. capable of reading and writing in an official language by the time a citizen has reached the age of 15. English is the official (meetings) language of the European Commission, 10% of the job market in Brussels; also, Arabic is 2nd most spoken language in Brussels according to fresh sources (around 10%)

Religion

As of 2012, 58% of Belgians identify as Roman Catholic. Other Christians comprise 7% of the population. Muslims comprise 5%. 27% of Belgians are agnostics, atheists or otherwise irreligious.

See also
Belgian nationality law
Metropolitan areas in Belgium

Notes

References

 
Society of Belgium